The 1995 WAFL season was the 111th season of the West Australian Football League in its various incarnations. Already depleted in strength by the rise of the West Coast Eagles, the WAFL suffered a further blow to its popularity and standard when the AFL, to counter the Eagles’ dominance of the early 1990s with a champion defence and vast player depth, introduced the Fremantle Dockers as a second Western Australian club.

The introduction of Fremantle into the AFL meant that the national league was competing with the WAFL on every weekend, and this led to an acceleration of the long-term decline in WAFL attendances. Crowds declined by forty-six percent compared to 1994 figures, and the resultant financial problems led to many proposals to improve the competition's appeal, ultimately leading to the abortive renaming ‘Westar Rules’ and the introduction of a ninth club, Mandurah-based , who have proved perennially un-competitive on-field. The WAFL's proposed move of perennial tailender Perth to the Perth Hills was voted down by the Demons’ board on 11 July, when that body's members voted 115 to 83 to remain at Lathlain Park, largely because of the unaffordability of WAFL-standard facilities in Gosnells.

1995 saw the abandonment of another abortive experiment, that of allowing a fifth team in the finals, although the “double-header” introduced with the final five in 1991 was retained for the first week of finals.

Under former star player Gary Buckenara, Subiaco dominated the home-and-away season losing only two matches, but were narrowly beaten in the second semi-final and thrashed in the Grand Final by West Perth – now firmly established at Joondalup – due to an outstanding performance from Darren Harris. Subiaco were spearheaded by full-forward Jason Heatley, who after several years of very poor records from full-forwards, produced a century of goals in a WAFL home-and-away season for the first time since Mick Rea ten seasons beforehand. The Falcons, who had not won a title since 1975 apart from a Colts premiership in 1990, won the pre-season ‘Emu Export Cup’ as well as the premiership.

In contrast, Swan Districts, under new coach Graham Melrose after John Todd returned to South Fremantle and having lost several key players including David Ogg, Kevin Caton and Paul Gow to country clubs, lost their first fifteen games and would not return to the finals until 2004. A plan to install lights at Bassendean for $160,000 was abandoned by the local council because it was thought there would be too much competition with sports such as basketball and soccer, whilst longtime president Bill Walker resigned under the duress of major financial problems.

Home-and-away season

Round 1

Round 2 (Easter weekend)

Round 3 (Anzac Day)

Round 4

Round 5

Round 6

Round 7

Round 8

Round 9 (Foundation Day)

Round 10

Round 11

Round 12

Round 13

Round 14

Round 15

Round 16

Round 17

Round 18

Round 19

Round 20

Round 21

Ladder

Finals

Semi-finals

Preliminary final

Grand Final

Notes
Perth were known as Victoria Park in the 1934 and 1935 seasons.The WAFL, along with the AFL, introduced extra time for finals tied in regulation time for the 1991 season.

References

External links
Official WAFL website
West Australian Football League (WAFL), 1995

West Australian Football League seasons
WAFL